Khabibullin or Khabibulin ( or Хабибулин) is a Tatar masculine surname, its feminine counterpart is Khabibullina or Khabibulina. It may refer to:

Albina Khabibulina (born 1992), Uzbekistani tennis player
Elvira Khabibullina, Russian prima ballerina
Nikolai Khabibulin (born 1973), Russian ice hockey goaltender
Timur Khabibulin (born 1995), Kazakhstani tennis player

See also
Khabibullin's conjecture on integral inequalities in mathematics 

Tatar-language surnames